Dyninno Group is a technology company that provides products and services in the travel, fintech, and entertainment sectors. It was founded in San Francisco, United States, in 2004.

As of 2022, Dyninno Group employs more than 5,500 people in the US, the UK, Canada, India, Colombia, Latvia, Moldova, Romania, Egypt, and the Philippines.

History 
Alex Weinstein, an American immigrant from Moldova, started working in the travel industry in California in the early 1990s.  In 2002, he launched asaptickets.com – a travel agency that sells airline tickets. In 2004, Weinstein founded the Dyninno Group (short for Dynamic Innovations). In 2013, Dyninno Travel started operations in Cebu City, Philippines. In 2016, Dynatech, a subdivision for Dyninno Group, was established in Riga, Latvia.

In 2017, the company introduced several lending services in Romania and Moldova: CreditPrime, CreditPlus.

In June 2017, a subsidiary company, Dynapay, was created and launched, which was initially used as an internal payment system for Dyninno Group, but later was offered to global clients and rebranded as Multipass.

In 2019, Dyninno's enterprises generated revenues of over $800 million.

Between 2019 and 2022 Dyninno Group opened offices in New Delhi (India), as well as in Manila (the Philippines).

In 2022, Dyninno Travel was restructured and rebranded as Trevolution. Trevolution Group sells over  50,000 airline tickets and package holidays monthly.

References 

Companies of Malta
2004 establishments in the United States